Curtis Mayfield Hibbert (born 2 September 1966) is a police constable and Canadian Olympian. He is the first Canadian and first person of colour to win World Championship medals in gymnastics. With five golds, Hibbert is the most successful gymnast in history in a single Commonwealth Games.

Early life
Born in Kingston, Jamaica, Hibbert immigrated to Canada with his family in 1970. He started gymnastics training three years later at age nine.

Gymnastics career
Hibbert first came to national attention in 1983 with appearances in the Canadian Nationals, Canada Winter Games, and Pan Am Games. In 1987 he won a silver medal in the high bar at the World Championships, setting up his appearance at the 1988 Seoul Olympics with the Canadian team, where he made the finals in three events and finished 22nd in the all-around competition. Hibbert was the star performer of Canada's Commonwealth Games team in 1990 winning 7 medals: 5 gold, 1 silver and 1 bronze.  Hibbert again competed for Team Canada in the 1992 Barcelona Olympic games, finishing 36th in the all-around. He won the silver medal at the 1987 World Gymnastics Championships in the high bar, and tied for bronze on vault at the 1992 Paris World Gymnastics Championships. Between 1987 and 1992 Hibbert won two World Championship medals, six Canadian All-Around titles, a Commonwealth Games All-Around title. Hibbert retired from competitive gymnastics in 1993.

Following retirement Hibbert established the Kids Super Gym Club in Erin Mills, Ontario, fostering a strictly non-competitive atmosphere where fun takes precedence for young athletes of all skill levels. Throughout his gymnastics career, Hibbert has been a volunteer coach of young gymnasts from across the globe. Hibbert has done hundreds of speaking engagements across the country focused on goal setting and translating the olympic experience into life experience. He has been to elementary and high schools across the city of Toronto speaking to students, helping teachers develop gymnastics programs and motivating young people to be active.

Stunt work
In 1995 Hibbert began a career as one of the most active stuntmen in both Canadian and American movie and television productions. Some of his many works include 16 Blocks, X-Men, Chicago, and Undercover Brother.
Furthermore since the mid 2000s, combined with his stunt work, Curtis Hibbert has also developed a career as a public servant with the government of the City of Toronto.

References

External links 
 
 

• Curtis Hibbert in the Public Sector https://www.tcdsb.org/FORCOMMUNITY/HeritageCelebration/AfricanCanadianHeritage/Documents/2016%20Feb%20Areas%205%20and%206%20ACHM%20Activities.pdf

1966 births
Living people
Sportspeople from Kingston, Jamaica
Black Canadian sportspeople
Canadian male artistic gymnasts
Commonwealth Games gold medallists for Canada
Jamaican emigrants to Canada
Medalists at the World Artistic Gymnastics Championships
Gymnasts at the 1990 Commonwealth Games
Olympic gymnasts of Canada
Gymnasts at the 1988 Summer Olympics
Gymnasts at the 1992 Summer Olympics
Commonwealth Games silver medallists for Canada
Commonwealth Games bronze medallists for Canada
Canadian police officers
Commonwealth Games medallists in gymnastics
Pan American Games bronze medalists for Canada
Gymnasts at the 1983 Pan American Games
Pan American Games medalists in gymnastics
Medalists at the 1983 Pan American Games
Medallists at the 1990 Commonwealth Games